Pass Creek may refer to:

Canada
Pass Creek, British Columbia, a settlement
Pass Creek (British Columbia), a stream
Pass Creek, a settlement in Municipal District of Greenview No. 16, Alberta

United States
Pass Creek (Elk Creek tributary), in Oregon
Pass Creek, a tributary of the Little Bighorn River in Montana